Dudley Stuart McGarel Hogg, 3rd Baron Magheramorne (3 December 1863 – 14 March 1946) was an Anglo-Irish peer.

He was the second son of James McGarel-Hogg, 1st Baron Magheramorne and was educated at Radley College.  He inherited the peerage from his brother in 1903.  Like his father, Magheramorne was a Conservative and Unionist.

In later life he retired to Bournemouth and was living in a nursing home in Banstead, Surrey at the time of his death. He is buried in Brompton Cemetery.  The peerage was inherited by his brother.

References

1863 births
1946 deaths
People educated at Radley College
3
Burials at Brompton Cemetery
Dudley